Acrolophus rastricornis is a moth of the family Acrolophidae. It is found on the Virgin Islands.

References

Moths described in 1932
rastricornis